Hamdir, Sörli, and Erpr were three brothers in Germanic heroic legend who have a historic basis in the history of the Goths.

Legend
According to the Edda and Völsunga saga, Hamdir and Sörli were the sons of Gjuki's daughter Guðrún and King Jonakr. Erpr was the son of Jonakr from an earlier marriage. Svanhildr, the daughter of Sigurðr and Guðrún, was also raised by Jonakr. 

King Jörmunrekr (Ermanaric) proposed to Svanhildr through his son Randver, but the treacherous Bicke said that Randver tried to win Svanhild's love. Consequently, Jörmunrekr sentenced Randver to death by hanging and had Svanhildr trampled to death by horses. Guðrún then agitated her sons Hamdir and Sörli to avenge their half-sister, and tells them not to hurt the stones on the road. When Sörli and Hamdir met Erpr en route, they did not understand his riddles and, thinking him arrogant, killed him.

During the night, they arrived and they cut off Jörmunrek's hands and feet. This made Jörmunrekr wake up and he cried for his housecarls. Hamdir said that if Erpr had been alive he would have cut off the head, and remark that they shouldn't have damaged the stones of the road. The housecarls could not kill the two brothers with sharp weapons, but an old one-eyed man (Odin) advised them to kill them with stones.  They are the last known generation of the Volsung lineage.

This is why skaldic poetry used the "sorrow of Jonakr's sons" as a kenning for stones.

In  Ynglingatal (9th century), Þjóðólfr of Hvinir mentions their death in a kenning on the death of the Swedish king Anund:

Sources and historic basis
The legend of Jörmunrek appears in the Poetic Edda as Hamðismál and Guðrúnarhvöt. It also appears in Bragi Boddason's Ragnarsdrápa, in the Völsunga saga, and in Gesta Danorum. Jordanes wrote in 551 that the Gothic king Ermanaric was upset with the attack of a subordinate king and had his wife Sunilda (i.e. Svanhildr) torn to pieces by horses and as revenge Ermanaric was pierced with spears by her brothers Ammius (Hamdir) and  Sarus (Sörli) and died from the wounds. The Annals of Quedlinburg (end of the 10th century) relates that the brothers Hemidus (Hamdir), Serila (Sörli), and Adaccar (Erpr/Odoacer) had cut off the hands of Ermanaric.

In popular culture
The legend forms the background behind Poul Anderson's short story "The Sorrow of Odin the Goth".

See also
 Lech, Czech and Rus
 Kyi, Shchek and Khoryv
 Ermenrichs Tod

Secondary source
An article on Hamder in Nordisk familjebok

References

German heroic legends
Heroes in Norse myths and legends
Nibelung tradition
Völsung cycle